Sentimientos  may refer to:

Sentimientos (album), an album by Colombian singer Charlie Zaa
"Sentimientos" (song), a song by Puerto Rican singer Ivy Queen
"Sentimientos" (tango), by Andrés Linetzky and Ernesto Romeo